Edward Jessup (May 26, 1766 – November 4, 1815) was a farmer and political figure in Upper Canada.

He was born in Albany, New York in 1766, the son of Edward Jessup, a United Empire Loyalist. He served with his father's Loyal Rangers, becoming a captain. After the American Revolution, he settled in Augusta Township. Jessup represented Grenville in the Legislative Assembly of Upper Canada from 1797 to 1800. In 1800, he was named justice of the peace in the Johnstown District. He became lieutenant-colonel in the Leeds militia in 1809. With his father, he laid out the town of Prescott in 1810. He died at Prescott in 1815.

Two of his sons also represented Grenville in the legislative assembly:
Edward in the 11th Parliament of Upper Canada
Hamilton Dibble in the 2nd Parliament of the Province of Canada.

References 
 
 
  Biography of his father

1766 births
1815 deaths
Members of the Legislative Assembly of Upper Canada
Canadian justices of the peace
United Empire Loyalists